Rideshare Drivers United is a lobbying group that advocates for the interests of rideshare drivers in California.

The group has its origins in the 2017 strikes by rideshare drivers at Los Angeles' LAX airport. 
It was also active in the 2019 Lyft and Uber drivers' strikes, and worked to oppose the 2020 California Proposition 22, which passed with more than 58% of the vote.

References

External links 

Occupational organizations
Road transportation in California
Organizations established in 2018
Tech sector trade unions
Lobbying in the United States
Transportation trade unions in the United States